ARA Almirante Brown was a central battery ironclad of the Argentine Navy built in the 1880s by Samuda Brothers in London. The ship was protected by a belt of  steel-faced armor and she carried a main battery of eight breech-loading guns. She was among the first major warships in the world to use steel armor, and remained the largest vessel in the Argentine fleet for over 15 years. Almirante Brown had a peaceful career in the fleet during the 1880s and 1890s. By the 1920s, she was reduced to a coastal defense ship, and remained in service until the early 1930s. She was stricken from the naval register in November 1932 and sold for scrapping.

Design

General characteristics and machinery

Her hull was steel-built, with a wood and zinc sheathing. The hull included a double bottom and a ram bow. She was fitted with two pole masts. The ship had a crew of 520 officers and men.

Her propulsion system consisted of two compound steam engines that drove a pair of propellers. Steam for the engines was provided by eight coal-fired, cylindrical water-tube boilers. The boilers were split into four separate, watertight boiler rooms, and both of the steam engines were in individual engine rooms. In addition to her steam engines, Almirante Brown was fitted with a sailing rig for auxiliary cruising.

Armament and armor

Almirante Brown was equipped with a main battery of eight  BLR Armstrong guns, all mounted individually in casemates. Six were in a central battery, and the other two were in the bow and stern. These breech-loading guns were a new development, which rendered Almirante Brown a significantly more powerful vessel than even those that had been completed a few years earlier. She also carried six  guns, also in single mounts, all on the upper deck. Four were mounted forward, and two were located aft, on either side of the 8-inch stern-chaser. Close-range defense against small craft was provided by a pair of 9-pounder guns and a pair of 7-pounder guns.

The ship was protected with compound armor with a steel face manufactured by the German firm Siemens; the use of steel armor was a new development in naval technology, and permitted significant weight savings. The central battery was protected by 8 in of armor plate in the lower strake, and 6 in of armor in the upper strake. The conning tower also had 8 in thick sides.

Service history

In 1878, Argentina made inquiries in Britain to buy a new, ocean-going capital ship for its navy, which to that point, had consisted of only coastal and riverine forces, centered on the two small s. Almirante Brown, the first large ironclad of the Argentine Navy, was ordered from the Samuda Brothers shipyard of London. She was launched on 6 October 1880, and cost the Argentine government £270,000. On 14 June 1881, she conducted speed trials on the Maplin Mile, and achieved her designed speed of 14 knots at full power. Upon her delivery to Argentina, she was the largest vessel in the Argentine fleet, and remained so until the four Garibaldi-class armored cruisers were acquired in the late 1890s. Almirante Brown was present during the ceremonies for the opening of the south basin in the harbor of Buenos Aires on 28 January 1889.

On 13 July 1892, the ship was thought to be lost in a storm that claimed the torpedo boat Rosales. The protected cruiser Veinticinco de Mayo was also believed to have sunk in the storm, though both survived. In the following year, Almirante Brown, along with most of the heavy units in the Argentine Navy, took part in putting down the naval defections in the revolution of 1893. In 1897, Almirante Brown went into dry dock at the La Seyne shipyard in Toulon for modernization. Her main battery guns were replaced with ten  50-caliber quick-firing Canet guns; six replaced the guns in the central battery, and the other four were mounted in pairs in place of the bow and stern guns. In addition, the old 4.7-inch guns were replaced with new quick-firing models. Her crew was reduced to 380 officers and men. By the 1920s, Almirante Brown had been reduced to a coastal defense and training ship, having long since been rendered obsolete by the dreadnought battleships Moreno and Rivadavia. On 17 December 1921, crewmen from Almirante Brown rowed ashore to defeat a group of about 250 brigands based in Mata Tapera. The ship remained in service until the early 1930s. On 17 November 1932, Almirante Brown was stricken from the naval register and subsequently discarded.

See also 
 List of ships of the Argentine Navy

Footnotes

References

Further reading 
 
 
 Burzaco, Ricardo and Patricio Ortíz. Acorazados y Cruceros de la Armada Argentina, 1881–1982. Buenos Aires: Eugenio B. Ediciones, 1997. . . (in Spanish)

External links 
 Battleship "Almirante Brown" – Histarmar website (Historia y Arqueología Marítima – Acorazado Almirante Brown – 1881)

1880 ships
Battleships of the Argentine Navy
Ships built in Cubitt Town
Coastal defence ships